The 1990–91 Michigan Wolverines men's basketball team represented the University of Michigan in intercollegiate college basketball during the 1990–91 season. The team played its home games in the Crisler Arena in Ann Arbor, Michigan, and was a member of the Big Ten Conference.  Under the direction of head coach Steve Fisher, the team finished eighth in the Big Ten Conference.  The team earned an invitation to the 1991 National Invitation Tournament (NIT) where it was eliminated in the first round. The team was unranked for the entire seventeen weeks of Associated Press Top Twenty-Five Poll, and it also ended the season unranked in the final UPI Coaches' Poll.  The team had a 0–7 record against ranked opponents.

Demetrius Calip served as team captain and earned team MVP.  The team's leading scorers were Calip (594 points), Michael Talley (318 points), and Kirk Taylor (301 points).  The leading rebounders were Eric Riley (242), Kirk Taylor (119), and Calip (112).  The leaders in assists were Calip (102), Talley (93) and Taylor (72).

Calip led the Big Ten Conference in three point shots made in conference games (48).  The team led the conference in team three point shots made with 118 during their conference games.

In the 32-team National Invitation Tournament, Michigan was eliminated by  71–64 in the first round.

Roster

Team players drafted into the NBA
One player from this team was selected in the NBA Draft.

References

External links
Michigan Wolverines men's basketball official website 

Michigan Wolverines men's basketball seasons
Michigan
Michigan
Michigan
Michigan